Diplodasys is a genus of worms belonging to the family Thaumastodermatidae.

The species of this genus are found in Europe.

Species:

Diplodasys ankeli 
Diplodasys caudatus 
Diplodasys meloriae 
Diplodasys minor 
Diplodasys pacificus 
Diplodasys platydasyoides 
Diplodasys remanei 
Diplodasys rothei 
Diplodasys sanctimariae 
Diplodasys swedmarki

References

Gastrotricha